Hansenia is a genus of flowering plant in the family Apiaceae, native to from Siberia to China. The genus was first described by Nikolai Turczaninow in 1844.

Species
, Plants of the World Online accepted the following species:
Hansenia forbesii (H.Boissieu) Pimenov & Kljuykov
Hansenia forrestii (H.Wolff) Pimenov & Kljuykov
Hansenia himalayensis (Ludlow) J.B.Tan & X.G.Ma
Hansenia mongholica Turcz.
Hansenia oviformis (R.H.Shan) Pimenov & Kljuykov
Hansenia phaea (Hand.-Mazz.) J.B.Tan & X.G.Ma
Hansenia weberbaueriana (Fedde ex H.Wolff) Pimenov & Kljuykov

References

Apioideae
Apioideae genera